Israeli citizenship law details the conditions by which a person holds citizenship of Israel. The two primary pieces of legislation governing these requirements are the 1950 Law of Return and 1952 Citizenship Law.

Every Jew in the world has the unrestricted right to immigrate to Israel and become an Israeli citizen. Individuals born within the country receive Israeli citizenship at birth if at least one parent is a citizen. Non-Jewish foreigners may naturalize after living in the country for at least three years while holding permanent residency and demonstrating knowledge in the Hebrew language. Naturalizing non-Jews are additionally required to renounce their previous nationalities, while Jewish immigrants are not subject to this requirement. All male and female Jewish citizens, as well as male citizens of Druze and Circassian descent must perform compulsory military service; other non-Jewish citizens and Haredi Jews are exempt from conscription.

Israel was formerly administered by the British Empire as part of a League of Nations mandate for Palestine and local residents were British protected persons. The dissolution of the mandate in 1948 and subsequent conflict created a set of complex citizenship circumstances for the non-Jewish inhabitants of the region that continue unresolved.

Terminology 
The distinction between the meaning of the terms citizenship and nationality is not always clear in the English language and differs by country. Generally, nationality refers a person's legal belonging to a state and is the common term used in international treaties when referring to members of a state; citizenship refers to the set of rights and duties a person has in that nation.

In the Israeli context, nationality is not linked to a person's origin from a particular territory but has a specific meaning encompassing the national constituency. Although the term may also be used in other countries to indicate a person's ethnic group, the meaning in Israeli law is particularly expansive by including any person practicing Judaism and their descendants. Members of the Jewish nationality form the core part of Israel's citizenry, while the Supreme Court of Israel has ruled that an Israeli nationality does not exist. Legislation has defined Israel as the nation state of the Jewish people since 2018.

History

National status under British mandate 

The region of Palestine was conquered by the Ottoman Empire in 1516. Accordingly, Ottoman nationality law applied to the area. Palestine was governed by the Ottomans for four centuries until British occupation in 1917 during the First World War. The area nominally remained an Ottoman territory following the conclusion of the war until the United Kingdom obtained a League of Nations mandate for the region in 1922. Similarly, local residents ostensibly continued their status as Ottoman subjects, although British authorities began issuing provisional certificates of Palestinian nationality shortly after the start of occupation.

The Treaty of Lausanne established the basis for separate nationalities in Mandatory Palestine and all other territories ceded by the Ottoman Empire. Ottoman/Turkish subjects who were ordinarily resident in Palestine on 6 August 1924 became Palestinian citizens on that date. Turkish nationals originating from Mandatory territory but habitually resident elsewhere on that date had a right to choose Palestinian citizenship, but this required an application within two years of the treaty's enforcement and approval by the Mandatory government. The Palestinian Citizenship Order 1925 confirmed the transition from Ottoman/Turkish to Palestinian citizenship in local legislation. This law was amended several times, with its final revision in 1942.

Legitimate children of a Palestinian father automatically held Palestinian citizenship. Any person born outside of these conditions who held no other nationality and were otherwise stateless at birth also automatically acquired citizenship. Foreigners could obtain Palestinian citizenship through naturalization after residing in the territory for at least two of the three years preceding an application, fulfilling a language requirement (in English, Hebrew, or Arabic), affirming their intention to permanently reside in Mandate territory, and satisfying a good character requirement.

Despite Britain's sovereignty over Palestinian territory, domestic law treated the mandate as foreign territory. Palestinian citizens were treated as British protected persons, rather than British subjects, meaning that they were aliens in the United Kingdom but could be issued Mandatory Palestine passports by British authorities. Protected persons could not travel to the UK without first requesting permission, but were afforded the same consular protection as British subjects when travelling outside of the British Empire. This arrangement continued until termination of the British mandate on 14 May 1948, the same date on which the State of Israel was established.

Post-1948 transition 
For the first four years after its establishment, Israel had no citizenship law and technically had no citizens. Despite Israel's status as the successor state to Mandatory Palestine, Israeli courts during this time offered conflicting opinions on the continuing validity of Palestinian citizenship legislation enacted during the British mandate. While almost all courts held that Palestinian citizenship had ceased to exist at the end of the mandate in 1948 without a replacement status, there was one case in which a judge ruled that all residents of Palestine at the time of Israel's establishment were automatically Israeli nationals. The Supreme Court settled this issue in 1952, ruling that Palestinian citizens of the British mandate had not automatically become Israeli.

Israeli citizenship policy is centered on two early pieces of legislation: the 1950 Law of Return and 1952 Citizenship Law. The Law of Return grants every Jew the right to migrate to and settle in Israel, reinforcing the central Zionist tenant of the return of all Jews to their traditional homeland. The Citizenship Law details the requirements for Israeli citizenship, dependent on an individual's religious affiliation, and explicitly repeals all prior British-enacted legislation concerning Palestinian nationality.

Status of Palestinian Arabs 

Jewish residents of former Mandatory Palestine at the time of Israel's establishment were granted Israeli citizenship on the basis of return, but non-Jewish Palestinians were subject to strict residency requirements for claiming that status. Non-Jewish residents in Israel could acquire citizenship on the basis of their residence in 1952 if they were nationals of the British mandate before 1948, had registered as Israeli residents since February 1949 and remained registered, and had not left the country before claiming citizenship.

These requirements were intended to systemically exclude Arabs from participation in the new state. The UNRWA estimated that 720,000 Palestinian Arabs were displaced during the 1948 Arab–Israeli War, with only 170,000 remaining in Israel following its establishment. Until the Citizenship Law was enacted in 1952, all of these individuals were stateless. About 90 percent of the remaining Arab population were barred from Israeli citizenship under the residence requirements and held no nationality.

Palestinians who returned to their homes in Israel after the war did not satisfy the conditions for citizenship under the 1952 law. This class of residents continued living in Israel but held no citizenship or residence status. A 1960 Supreme Court ruling partially addressed this by allowing a looser interpretation of the residential requirements; individuals who had permission to temporarily leave Israel during or shortly after the conflict qualified for citizenship, despite their gap in residence. The Knesset amended the Citizenship Law in 1980 to fully resolve statelessness for this group of residents; all Arab residents who had been living in Israel before 1948 were granted citizenship regardless of their eligibility under the 1952 residence requirements, along with their children.

Palestinians who fled to neighboring countries were not granted citizenship there and remained stateless, except those who resettled in Jordan (which included the West Bank during this period). West Bank Palestinians held Jordanian nationality until 1988, when Jordan renounced its sovereignty claim over the area and unilaterally severed all links to the region. Palestinians living in the West Bank lost Jordanian nationality while those residing in the rest of Jordan maintained that status.

Qualification under right of return

Apostate and irreligious Jews 

Although the Law of Return gave every Jew the right to immigrate to Israel, the original text and all other legislation up to that point lacked a clear definition for who was considered a Jew. This absence of clarity was tested in the 1962 Supreme Court case Rufeisen v Minister of the Interior in which Oswald Rufeisen, a Polish Jew who had converted to Catholicism, was ruled to have no longer met the criterion of being a Jew on his religious conversion. The Supreme Court further elaborated on this in 1970, when it determined that persons who are born to Jewish mothers but do not practice Judaism are considered to be part of the Jewish people as long as they have not converted to another religion. Converting to any other faith is considered to be a deliberate act of dissociation from the Jewish people.

The Law of Return was amended in 1970 to provide a more detailed explanation of who qualifies: a Jew means any person born to a Jewish mother, or someone who has converted to Judaism and is not an adherent of another religion. The amendment extended the right of return to Israel to include children, grandchildren, and a spouse of a Jew, as well as spouses of their children and grandchildren. This entitlement was given despite the fact that not all applicable persons would be considered Jews under halakha (Jewish religious law).

The Citizenship Law was amended in 1971 to allow any Jew who formally expresses their desire to migrate to Israel to immediately become an Israeli citizen, without any requirement to enter Israeli territory. This change was made to facilitate emigration of Jews from the Soviet Union, who were routinely denied exit visas, especially after the 1967 Six-Day War. Migration from the Soviet Union remained at low levels until exit restrictions were relaxed in the late 1980s.

While some emigrants made their way to Western countries, most settled in Israel. Other states imposed quotas on the number of Jews who could immigrate from the Soviet Union at the request of the Israeli government, which intended to redirect the flow of migrants to Israel itself. After the United States began enforcing an entry quota, the number of Soviet Jews emigrating to Israel increased sharply from just 2,250 in 1988 to over 200,000 in 1990 and remained at high levels following the dissolution of the Soviet Union in 1991 and subsequent 1998 Russian financial crisis. About 940,000 Jews from the former Soviet Union departed for Israel between 1989 and 2002. Most of this wave of migrants were nonpracticing and secular Jews; a significant portion were not considered Jewish under halakha, but qualified for immigration based on the Law of Return.

Recognition of non-Orthodox Jews 
The definition of a Jew in the 1970 Law of Return amendment does not explain the meaning of "conversion" and has been interpreted to allow for adherents of any Jewish movement to qualify for right of return. The Chief Rabbinate operates under an Orthodox interpretation of halakha and is the authoritative institution for religious matters within Israel, which has led to disputes over whether converts into non-Orthodox movements of Judaism should be recognized as Jews. Foreigners who convert to Conservative or Reform Judaism within the country have been entitled to citizenship under the Law of Return since 2021. Both the Chief Rabbinate and Supreme Court consider followers of Messianic Judaism as Christians and specifically bar them from right of return, unless they otherwise have sufficient Jewish descent.

Ethiopian Jews, also known as Beta Israel, lived as an isolated community away from mainstream Judaism since at least the Early Middle Ages prior to their contact with the outside world in the 19th century. Over the course of their prolonged separation, this population developed a number of religious practices heavily influenced by Coptic Christianity differing from those of other Jews. Their status as Jews was disputed until the Chief Rabbinate confirmed its recognition of this group as Jews in 1973 and declared its support for their immigration to Israel. Following Ethiopia's communist revolution and the subsequent outbreak of civil war, the Israeli government resettled 45,000 people, nearly the entire Ethiopian Jewish population.

Falash Mura 
Migrating with the Beta Israel were the Falash Mura, Jews who converted to Christianity for ease of integration with Ethiopian society but largely remained associated the Ethiopian Jewish community. A ministerial decision in 1992 ruled this community ineligible for right of return, but some migrants were allowed to immigrate to Israel for family reunification. Subsequent government decisions have allowed more Falash Mura to migrate, though they are required to convert to Judaism before receiving citizenship. About 33,000 members of this community entered Israel from 1993 to 2013.

Acquisition and loss of citizenship

Entitlement by birth, descent, or adoption 
Individuals born within the territory of Israel receive citizenship at birth if at least one parent is an Israeli citizen. Children born overseas are Israeli citizens by descent if either parent is a citizen, limited to the first generation born abroad. Adopted children are automatically granted citizenship at the time of adoption, regardless of their religious status. Individuals born in Israel who are between the ages of 18 and 21 and have never held any nationality are entitled to Israeli citizenship, provided that they have been continuously resident in the country for the five years immediately preceding their application.

Voluntary acquisition 

Any Jew who immigrates to Israel as an oleh (Jewish immigrant) under the Law of Return automatically becomes an Israeli citizen. In this context, a Jew means a person born to a Jewish mother, or someone who has converted to Judaism and does not adhere to another religion. This right to citizenship extends to any children or grandchildren of a Jew, as well as the spouse of a Jew, or the spouse of a child or grandchild of a Jew. A Jew who voluntarily converts to another religion forfeits their right to claim citizenship under this provision. At the end of 2020, 21 percent of the total Jewish population in Israel was born overseas.

Foreigners may naturalize as Israeli citizens after residing in Israel for at least three of the previous five years while holding permanent residency. Candidates must be physically present in the country at the time of application, be able to demonstrate knowledge of the Hebrew language, have the intention of permanently settling in Israel, and renounce any foreign nationalities. Although Arabic was previously an official language and has a special recognized status, there is no similar knowledge stipulation for it as part of the naturalization process. All of these requirements may be partially or completely waived for a candidate if they: served in the Israel Defense Forces or suffered the loss of a child during their military service period, are a minor child of a naturalized parent or Israeli resident, or made extraordinary contributions to Israel. Successful applicants are required to swear an oath of allegiance to the State of Israel.

Dual/multiple citizenship is explicitly allowed for an oleh who becomes Israeli by right of return. This is to encourage the overseas Jewish diaspora to migrate to Israel without forcing them to lose their previous national statuses. By contrast, naturalization candidates are required to renounce their original nationalities to obtain citizenship. Persons opting to naturalize are typically individuals who migrate to Israel for employment or family reasons, or are permanent residents of East Jerusalem and the Golan Heights.

Relinquishment and deprivation 
Israeli citizenship can be voluntarily relinquished by making a declaration of renunciation, provided that the declarant is living overseas, already possesses another nationality, and has no military service obligations. Returnees living in Israel who obtained Israeli citizenship may also voluntarily renounce that status if continuing to hold it would cause their loss of another country's nationality. Between 2003 and 2015, there were 8,308 people who renounced their Israeli citizenship.

Citizenship may be involuntarily removed from individuals who fraudulently acquired it or from those who willfully perform an act that constitutes a breach of loyalty to the state. The Minister of Interior may revoke citizenship from a person who obtained that status based on false information within three years of that person having become an Israeli citizen. For persons who fradulently acquired citizenship more than three years earlier, the Minister must request the Administrative Court to revoke citizenship. Revocation on the basis of disloyalty is exceptionally rare; Israel has revoked citizenship in these circumstances on three occasions since 1948, twice in 2002 and once in 2017. Israeli citizenship may also be revoked from citizens who illegally travel to countries officially declared as enemy states (Syria, Lebanon, Iraq, and Iran) or if they obtain nationality from one of those nations.

Spousal access to citizenship 
Non-Jewish spouses have right of return if they immigrate to Israel at the same time as their Jewish spouses; same-sex spouses of Jews have been eligible for this since 2014. Otherwise, they are granted temporary residence permits that are gradually replaced by less restrictive conditions of stay over a period of 4.5 years until they become eligible for citizenship. Until 1996, non-Jewish spouses without right of return were immediately granted permanent residency upon their entry into Israel. Marriages must be valid under Israeli law for the partner of a citizen to be eligible for citizenship under the 4.5-year naturalization process. Common-law or same-sex partners are subject to a longer 7.5-year gradual process that grants permanent residency, after which they may apply for naturalization under the standard procedure.

Male spouses under the age of 35 and female spouses under 25 originating from the Palestinian territories are prohibited from obtaining citizenship and residency. The 2003 Citizenship and Entry into Israel Law effectively discouraged further marriages between Israeli citizens and Palestinians by preventing couples in these circumstances from cohabitation. Although challenged as unconstitutional, this restriction was upheld by the Supreme Court in 2006 and 2012 and continued to be effective until the law's expiration in July 2021. These restrictions were reimplemented in law with no expiration time in March 2022.

Rights and obligations of citizens 

Israeli citizens are required to register for Israeli identity cards, eligible to hold Israeli passports, and able to vote in all elections. Dual citizens are prohibited from serving in the Knesset or in any government roles that require handling sensitive security matters. Conscription is mandatory for all male and female Jewish citizens, and male citizens of Druze and Circassian descent; non-Jewish citizens and Haredi Jews are exempted.

References

Citations

General sources

External links 
 Ministry of Aliyah and Immigration

Israeli nationality law
Zionism